City of Camden Historic District is a national historic district located at Camden, Kershaw County, South Carolina. The district encompasses 48 contributing buildings, 8 contributing sites, 2 contributing structures, and 3 contributing objects in Camden.  The district is mostly residential but also include public buildings, a church, and a cemetery. Camden's architecture is classically inspired and includes examples of Federal, Greek Revival, and Classical Revival, in addition to cottage-type, Georgian, Charleston-type with modifications, and mansion-type houses. Several of the city's buildings were designed by architect Robert Mills.  Notable buildings include the Kershaw County Courthouse (1826), U.S. Post Office, Camden Opera House and Clock Tower, Camden Powder
Magazine, Trinity United Methodist Church, St. Mary's Catholic Church, Gov. Fletcher House, Greenleaf Villa (Samuel Flake House), The First National Bank of Camden, and the separately listed Bethesda Presbyterian Church and Kendall Mill.

It was listed on the National Register of Historic Places in 1971.

References

External links

Historic American Buildings Survey in South Carolina
Historic districts on the National Register of Historic Places in South Carolina
Greek Revival architecture in South Carolina
Neoclassical architecture in South Carolina
Federal architecture in South Carolina
Georgian architecture in South Carolina
Camden, South Carolina
Robert Mills buildings
Buildings and structures in Kershaw County, South Carolina
National Register of Historic Places in Kershaw County, South Carolina